The nabal is a long, straight brass horn used in Korean traditional music. As the instrument has no valves or finger holes it is not a melodic instrument but rather plays a single sustained tone. The precise frequency of the tone produced can be quite different depending on the size of the individual instrument. The total length is not constant, ranging from 103 cm to 122 cm. Also, the shape of the instrument is slightly different.

The nabal has historically been used primarily in the military procession music called daechwita, as well as in nongak (rural farmers' music) to signal the beginning and end of performances.

See also
Music of Korea
Traditional Korean musical instruments

References

External links
Article about nabal
Photo of a nabal

Korean musical instruments
Brass instruments